David L. Sedlak is an American environmental engineer and currently the Plato Malozemoff Professor at University of California, Berkeley. He was previously Editor-in-Chief of American Chemical Society's ES&T and ES&T Letters. His research interests are chemical contaminants and water resources. He was elected a member of the National Academy of Engineering in 2016 for contributions to environmental aqueous chemistry, especially in the areas of water reuse, water contaminants, and urban water infrastructure.

Education
He earned his PhD in Water Chemistry from University of Wisconsin at Madison in 1992 and B.S. in Environmental Science from Cornell University in 1986.

Publications
 Shane A. Snyder, Paul Westerhoff, Yeomin Yoon, and David L. Sedlak. Environmental Engineering Science. July 2004, 20(5): 449–469. https://doi.org/10.1089/109287503768335931
 William A. Mitch, Jonathan O. Sharp, R. Rhodes Trussell, Richard L. Valentine, Lisa Alvarez-Cohen, and David L. Sedlak. Environmental Engineering Science. July 2004, 20(5): 389–404. https://doi.org/10.1089/109287503768335896
 Formation of N-Nitrosodimethylamine (NDMA) from Dimethylamine during Chlorination, William A. Mitch and David L. Sedlak, Environ. Sci. Technol., 2002, 36 (4), pp 588–595

References

University of California, Berkeley faculty
Environmental engineers
Cornell University alumni
21st-century American engineers
Year of birth missing (living people)
Living people